Atractus modestus is a species of snake in the family Colubridae. In English the species goes by the common name modest ground snake while in Spanish it goes by tierrera modesta or culebra tierrera modesta. 

The species reproduces sexually. The species has been labeled as vulnerable by the IUCN.

The species can be found in western Ecuador. It is locally frequent in Mindo, Ecuador.

References 

Atractus
Snakes of South America
Reptiles of Ecuador
Endemic fauna of Ecuador
Reptiles described in 1894
Taxa named by George Albert Boulenger